Union Sportive Sandweiler is an association football club based in Sandweiler, in southern Luxembourg. Founded in 1937, the club's senior team currently plays in the Luxembourg Division of Honour, the second tier of the league system, after winning promotion at the end of the 2011–12 season.

Sandweiler play their home matches at the Stade Norbert Hübsch in the town, and as of July 2012 are coached by Portuguese manager Paulo Gomes.

References
US Sandweiler club information at FLF.lu 
US Sandweiler club history at USSandweiler.com

External links
US Sandweiler official website

Football clubs in Luxembourg
Association football clubs established in 1937
1937 establishments in Luxembourg